Lo Dijo el Corazón is an album by Joan Sebastian, released in 19 February 2002, through the record label Musart Records. In 2003, the album earned Sebastian a Grammy Award for Best Mexican/Mexican-American Album.

Track listing
All songs written by Sebastian.
 "Cascadita de Te Quieros" – 3:00
 "Ciega y Loca" – 3:00
 "Piromaniaco" – 2:51
 "Tenme Fe" – 3:47
 "El Pisotón" – 3:17
 "Que Bonita Pareja" – 3:00
 "Manantial de Llanto" – 3:32
 "Besos Peregrinos" – 3:46
 "Barrio Viejo" – 2:52
 "Dos Opciones" – 3:27
 "Lo Dijo el Corazón" – 3:36
 "A Gu Gu Di Di da Da" – 3:33

Chart performance

References

External links
 Joan Sebastian's official site

2002 albums
Joan Sebastian albums
Spanish-language albums
Albums produced by Joan Sebastian
Grammy Award for Best Mexican/Mexican-American Album